Miguel Ángel Rodríguez Rivera, known professionally as Miky Woodz, is a Puerto Rican rapper. To date, he has released three studio albums, Before Famous in 2017, El OG in 2018, and most recently, in 2020, Los 90 Piketes, which are all commercial successes.

Personal life 
Woodz was born in Carolina, Puerto Rico. According to Woodz, he sacrificed a job in a warehouse that paid him minimal wage to continue with his passion for music. Woodz also has a young son named "Meek".

Career 
His debut album was Before Famous released in 2017, which reached number four in Billboard and number 20 in Latin Album Sales. He then released his second studio album through Gol2 Records, SoldOut Records, and GLAD Empire Records in 2018, entitled El OG. Highlighted by the song "Estamos Clear" with Bad Bunny, it debuted at number six on Billboards Top Latin Albums chart and had collaborations with Noriel, Farruko, De La Ghetto, Pusho, Juhn, Ñejo, Darkiel, and Bad Bunny. The song "Estamos Clear" was censored in the Dominican Republic.

Miky Woodz gained commercial ground in the mid-2010s with featured roles on tracks by artists such as Farruko, Benny Benni, and Juhn. He signed to the Florida-based label Gol2 Latin Music, where he released songs such as "Alcoba [Remix]", "En Lo Oscuro Sin Perse", and "Tarde o Temprano", all three of which amassed streams and millions of views on YouTube.

Discography

Studio albums

Extended plays

Singles

As lead artist

As featured artist

As charted and certified songs

References 

1991 births
Living people
People from Carolina, Puerto Rico
Latin trap musicians
Puerto Rican rappers
Puerto Rican reggaeton musicians